Atmakur is a  small town  in Nellore district of the Indian state of Andhra Pradesh. It is a municipality in Atmakur mandal. The town is the headquarters of Atmakur mandal and Assembly Constituency.

Governance 

Civic administration

Atmakur Municipal Council is the seat of local government which administers Kavali town.

Politics

Atmakur (Assembly constituency) is an assembly constituency of Andhra Pradesh. Present M.L.A. Mekapati Vikram Reddy from YSRCP.

Prominent People 
Atmakur Venkata Subbaiah Naidu served as a Head Village Administrative Officer for 25 years.

Education 
The primary and secondary school education is imparted by government, aided and private schools, under the School Education Department of the state. The medium of instruction followed by different schools are English, Telugu.

Transport

Roadways

Railways

Air

See also 
 List of towns in Andhra Pradesh
 List of municipalities in Andhra Pradesh

References

External links 

Towns in Nellore district